Tibor Mamusich (19 November 1911 – 22 October 1999) was a Hungarian rower.

Mamusich competed at the 1936 Summer Olympics in Berlin with the coxless pair alongside Károly Győry where they came fourth. They also competed in the coxed pair, with László Molnár as coxswain, but they did not start in their semi-final race.

References

1911 births
1999 deaths
Hungarian male rowers
Olympic rowers of Hungary
Rowers at the 1936 Summer Olympics
People from Baja, Hungary
European Rowing Championships medalists
Sportspeople from Bács-Kiskun County